Stacey-Ann Williams (born 8 March 1999) is a Jamaican athlete. She competed in the mixed 4 × 400 metres relay event at the 2020 Summer Olympics.

References

External links
 Texas Longhorns bio
 

1999 births
Living people
Jamaican female sprinters
Athletes (track and field) at the 2020 Summer Olympics
Olympic athletes of Jamaica
Place of birth missing (living people)
Texas Longhorns women's track and field athletes
Medalists at the 2020 Summer Olympics
Olympic bronze medalists in athletics (track and field)
Olympic bronze medalists for Jamaica
20th-century Jamaican women
21st-century Jamaican women